Joe O'Brien may refer to:

Joe O'Brien (American football) (born 1972), American football player / coach
Joe O'Brien (basketball) (born 1955), American basketball coach
Joe O'Brien (cyclist) (fl. 1959–1960), Irish cyclist
Joe O'Brien (footballer) (1875–?), Scottish footballer
Joe O'Brien (harness racing) (1917–1984), American driver, trainer and owner
Joe O'Brien (politician), Irish Green Party politician and TD in the 32nd Dáil

See also 
Joe O'Brien Field, Elizabethton, Tennessee
Joseph O'Brien (disambiguation)